The Laboratory Project is an organisation founded by entrepreneur and former Ministry of Sound Operations Director, Tony Rigg. Its aim is to provide a platform to expose brilliant music with their Taste Masters compilation series. Taste Masters was officially launched on 30 October 2010 at Fac 251 (The Factory) in Manchester, a club owned in part, by ex-Joy Division/New Order bassist Peter Hook, with the objective of recognising real musicianship. Rigg and Peter (Hooky) Hook also went on to develop the innovative Master of Arts programme in Music Industry Management & Promotion at the University of Central Lancashire which was launched in September 2012 in association with Factory.

Rigg, after success in the dance music genre, having worked on numerous remix projects for All Around the World Records, as well as having singles under his own collaborative vehicles featured on their Clubland compilation series, started The Laboratory Project due to a belief that the popular music genre had become too contrived, and more about the business rather than music. Despite Rigg having success in electronic music, his roots lay in the organic musician orientated band scene.

The original infrastructure featured Rigg overseeing the venture and collaborating with Paul Hutchinson, whose band Espionage released two albums produced by the multi-award winning Roy Thomas Baker, whose credits include records by The Smashing Pumpkins, Devo, The Stranglers and Queen.

Taste Masters (EXP018) featured 14 tracks from 13 different bands and artists including Evenhand, Dresden, The Horn Brothers, Our Day Remains and Fez. Paul White (Editor in Chief of the recording and production publication Sound on Sound) also contributed an instrumental track, "Bryce Canyon", which illustrates the eclecticism and production values that are characteristic of The Laboratory Project. It is a trademark of the label to feature music that is original, informative and that encourages listeners to deviate from the comfort of contrived mainstream pop.

The Laboratory Project also have an electronic music compilation series called Dance, the first of which was previewed at the Winter Music Conference, Miami, receiving critical acclaim from music industry professionals such as Darryl Pandy (vocalist featured on Farley "Jackmaster" Funk's 1986 hit, "Love Can't Turn Around") and Howard Kessler, who has served on the Board of Governors for the National Academy of Recorded Arts and Sciences (Grammy Awards).

The music can be purchased or listened to via online stores and subscription services such as iTunes and Napster, allowing the music to reach a global audience. Limited-edition CDs are produced for each release, making them rare and sought after.

The second in the Taste Masters series (Volume 2) (EXP025) was released 28 May 2011, consisting of 11 tracks and contributions from over 80 musicians featuring new and established artists as well as guest appearances from respected industry practitioners, including Chris Britton (The Troggs), MC Tunes of 808 State and Dust Junkys fame, Clint Boon (Inspiral Carpets), Rowetta (Happy Mondays) et al.  The album introduced a number of bands that had not previously released material commercially including Super 8 Cynics, Straightlaces, China White, and Dresden in collaboration with the award-winning Leyland Band.

Taste Masters Volume 3 (EXP027) followed on 1 January 2012 with 15 tracks and the familiar formula of new and established artists presenting eclectica.  Saturday Night Gym Club, a band popularised by substantial BBC Radio 1 airplay, open the album with up tempo electronica.  Some of the previous Taste Masters artists are included again such as Rowetta, Paul White and MC Tunes whose featured track 'Me and Baby Brother' was recorded in 1991 under the supervision of Trevor Horn at Sarm Studios London.  The long lost master tapes from 1991 were rediscovered in 2011, and digitally remastered for inclusion on the album.  Another version of the 'Baby Brother' track was recorded featuring Gabrielle on vocals but that version remains lost at the time of this article.  Though primarily intended for digital distribution a limited edition CD of Taste Masters 3 was made available for a limited period of time though this only featured 14 tracks.         
Capacity live music events with large numbers of artists playing live sets in a very short space of time are becoming a trademark of the label. Rigg claims that this is possible due to the extremely high calibre of musicianship and professionalism within the label's roster.

MC Tunes lost second album, Damage by Stereo, was first publicly heard 19 April 2014 at a live event, playing the actual master tapes, and finally released digitally and as a limited edition double CD by way of a collaboration between Hacienda Records, The Laboratory Project & UCLan 7 February 2015, 24 years after it was made.

Taste Masters Volume 4 (EXP030) was released 23 September 2013.  The album launch was marked with another capacity event at Factory 251.  The album featured some familiar faces as well as some new talent including If You Like To Dance with their Radio 1 play listed track Skin & Bone, Santiago Street Machine with Noisemaker, Mike Moss's Emotion Machine and Turrentine Jones with a specially recorded track "The Hunger", a version of which was debuted on the BBC Introducing Stage at the Glastonbury Festival.

References

External links 

Manchester's Hacienda and Peter Hook inspire new university master's course
Rapper debuts album 23 years late

British record labels
Record labels established in 2010